Brigit's Garden is a and open-air museum in County Galway, Ireland, located to the west of Lough Corrib and dedicated to the goddess Brigid and the Celtic calendar.

The founders describe it as "place of connection with nature, beauty and Celtic heritage and a resource for education, reflection and creativity."

References

External links
Official site

Archaeological sites in County Galway
Museums in County Galway
Archaeological museums in the Republic of Ireland
Open-air museums in the Republic of Ireland